Kaj may refer to:

Given name
 Kaj Arnö (born 1963)
 Kaj Birket-Smith (1893–1977), Danish philologist and anthropologist
 Kaj Birksted (1915–1996), Danish fighter pilot
 Kaj Björk (born 1918), Swedish social democratic politician
 Kaj Busch (21st century), Australian television presenter
 Kaj Christiansen (1921–2008), Danish football forward
 Kaj Chydenius (born 1939), Finnish composer
 Kaj Czarnecki (born 1936), Finnish Olympic fencer
 Kaj Franck (1911–1989), Finnish designer
 Kaj Frederiksen (1916–1991), Danish boxer
 Kaj Gnudtzmann (1880–1948), Danish gymnast
 Kaj Aksel Hansen (1917–1987), Danish footballer
 Kaj Hansen (footballer born 1940) (1940–2009), Danish footballer
 Kaj Hasselriis (born 1974), Canadian journalist
 Kaj Ikast (1935–2020), Danish politician
 Niels Kaj Jerne (1911–1994), Danish immunologist
 Kaj Leo Johannesen (born 1964), Prime Minister of the Faroe Islands
 Kaj Ulrik Linderstrøm-Lang (1896–1959), Danish scientist
 Kaj Munk (1898–1944), Danish playwright
 Kaj Poulsen (born 1942), Danish footballer in the striker position
 Kaj Ramsteijn (born 1990), Dutch footballer
 Kaj Schmidt (born 1926), Danish Olympic sprint canoer who competed in the early 1960s
 Kaj Skagen (born 1949), Norwegian writer
 Kaj Stenvall (born 1951), Finnish artist
 Kaj Aage Gunnar Strand (1907–2000), Danish astronomer
 Kaj Sylvan (born 1923), Danish Olympic sprint canoer who competed in the late 1950s
 Kaj Uldaler (1906–1987), Danish amateur football player

Surname 

 András Kaj (born 1977), Hungarian footballer
 Kølig Kaj (born 1971), Danish rapper
Kaja (name)

Danish masculine given names